Hugh Hearty (16 June 1912 — after 1939) was a Scottish professional footballer who played as a defender.

Career
Born in Edinburgh, Hearty began his career with Heart of Midlothian. He was released by the club in 1935, moving to Cardiff City. He made 18 league appearances during the 1935–36 season but left to join Clapton Orient where he finished his professional career.

References

1912 births
Date of death missing
Footballers from Edinburgh
Scottish footballers
Heart of Midlothian F.C. players
Cardiff City F.C. players
Leyton Orient F.C. players
English Football League players
Association football fullbacks